Western Michigan University Cooley Law School ("Cooley") is a private law school in Lansing, Michigan and Riverview, Florida. It was established in 1972. At its peak in 2010, Cooley had over 3,900 students and was the largest US law school by enrollment; as of the Spring of 2022, Cooley had approximately 500 students between its two campuses.

History

Founding
The Thomas M. Cooley Law School was established by a group of lawyers and judges led by Thomas E. Brennan, a former Chief Justice of the Michigan Supreme Court. The school was named in honor of Thomas McIntyre Cooley (1824–1898), a prominent 19th-century jurist, who was also a former Michigan Supreme Court Chief Justice, and former dean of the University of Michigan Law School.

Cooley was incorporated in October 1971, with operation dependent on approval of the State Board of Education. Despite opposition from a committee of lawyers and law professors, the Board of Education approved establishment of the school in summer 1972 and the school began operations on January 10, 1973.  The problems of funding and facilities raised at the Board of Education were not yet resolved but Brennan expressed confidence these issues would be worked out.

Expansion and Contraction

Lansing campus
Cooley opened in 1973 in a small building on Grand Avenue near downtown Lansing. Cooley opened as night school for the first six months with 76 students and had 221 students by the end of 1973. The faculty included active judges and part-time professors.

In 1974, Cooley purchased and then extensively renovated the former Lansing Masonic Temple Building The purchase price was $400,000, and renovation costs were over $10 million, to house the school. The Temple building housed most of the operations of the law school until the Cooley Center Building was completed, and continued to be used by the school for instruction until 2008, and for operations until 2014.

Cooley renovated the former JCPenney building in downtown Lansing as the Thomas E. Brennan Law Library, opening in 1993. The purchase price was $700,000 and the cost of renovation was $11 million.

Cooley purchased and then extensively renovated the former Lansing Commerce Center Building over the period from 2004 to 2007, with a later buildout in 2003 to become the principal teaching and administrative center of the law school, the Cooley Center. The original 14-story office building was redesigned as a 10-story building with higher ceilings to accommodate classrooms. The purchase price was $1.5 million, and renovations cost $35 million.

In 2010, Cooley expanded the Brennan Library, opening the first phase of a $6 million expansion, adding The Center for Research and Study in the former Town Center Building, eventually doubling the size of the library to 138,927 square feet, to become second largest law school library by size.

Though not a part of the law school campus, Cooley was also the name sponsor of "Cooley Law School Stadium", currently Jackson Field, the home stadium of the baseball minor league Lansing Lugnuts in downtown Lansing from 2010 to 2020.

Over the 2021-2022 timeframe, Cooley moved the Brennan Library to the Cooley Center, and closed the Center for Research and Study, consolidating all of its Lansing campus operations to the Cooley Center building.

Riverview campus
In May 2012, Cooley opened a new branch campus in Riverview, Florida. The initial enrollment was 104, with facilities designed to accommodate 700 students.  The initial campus 132,000-square-foot building included a 25,000-square-foot law library, 336-seat auditorium and 24 classrooms. Full curriculum was planned to be rolled out over a 3-year period, with 65 full time faculty and staff and 35 part-time faculty.

Former campuses

 Auburn Hills: In 2002, Cooley began offering first-year classes at facilities on the campus of Oakland University in Auburn Hills with 28 students. By 2009 enrollment at the Auburn Hills campus had increased to 670 students, and Cooley built a 65,000 ft2 addition to accommodate up to 1,200 students. In 2019, Cooley closed its Auburn Hills campus.
 Grand Rapids: In 2003, Cooley also commenced offering classes in Grand Rapids, Michigan and opened a campus in 2006.  At its peak, the Grand Rapids campus had approximately 700 students. In 2020, Cooley announced it would close its Grand Rapids campus by August 31, 2021, pending approval by accrediting agencies, and that it had ceased providing classes at WMU's Kalamazoo campus.
 Ann Arbor: In 2009, Cooley opened a branch campus in Ann Arbor, Michigan with an initial enrollment of 84 students. After suffering a 35% decline in enrollment across its five campuses between 2012 and 2013, Cooley announced in July 2014, that it would not be enrolling first year students on its Ann Arbor campus for the following term. The announcement also called for cuts in faculty and staff. In August 2014, Cooley had begun laying off faculty and staff at all its campuses. A JD Journal article claimed that the layoffs would exceed 50%, but James Robb denied this claim. In October 2014 Cooley announced the Ann Arbor campus would close at year-end.
 Kalamazoo: At the same time as it announced the closing of the Ann Arbor campus, Cooley restated its intent to offer classes in Kalamazoo, Michigan in connection with its affiliation with Western Michigan University ("WMU"). Cooley closed its campus in Kalamazoo in 2020.

Western Michigan University affiliation
On July 28, 2014, the ABA and the Higher Learning Commission gave their approval to an affiliation between Cooley and WMU. On August 13, 2014, the affiliation became official and included Cooley changing its name from "Thomas M. Cooley Law School" to "Western Michigan University Cooley Law School". Cooley then offered classes on each of Western Michigan's four campuses.

On November 5, 2020, WMU's board of trustees voted to end its affiliation with Cooley, indicating the board believed that affiliation with Cooley had become a distraction from the university's core mission. The disassociation requires three years to take effect.

Accreditation
Cooley has been accredited by the American Bar Association (ABA) since 1975 and the Higher Learning Commission since 2001.

In 2017, Cooley was sanctioned by the ABA for violating the ABA requirement that schools only admit students who appear capable of earning a Juris Doctor degree and passing a bar exam. The ABA announced in April 2018 that the school was now in compliance with the ABA standards for admissions, and the sanction was lifted.

In 2020, the ABA's Section of Legal Education and Admissions to the Bar determined Cooley had failed to significantly comply with Standard 316, which was revised in 2019 to provide that at least 75% of an accredited law school's graduates who took a bar exam must pass one within two years of graduation. Cooley failed to reach the 75% standard as demonstrated by statistics released by the ABA at the end of April, 2021. Those statistics showed Cooley with a 62.31% pass rate for Class of 2018 graduates, compared with 66.01% for Class of 2017 graduates.  Cooley was found in 2022 to have a 59.51% ultimate bar passage rate for the Class of 2019, but was granted a two-year extension to meet the 316 standard subject to various conditions including working with faculty to improve teaching and learning, reviewing the effects of more rigorous grading policies, and making a “significant financial investment” in a “reliable plan” to ensure that the law school has resources to operate in compliance with the standard.

Ranking and reputation

U.S. News & World Report Ranks Cooley between 147 and 192 overall, and between 53 and 69 for part-time law schools in its survey of best law schools in America for 2023.

Cooley has been repeatedly characterized as "the worst law school in America." While its reputation had long been battered in Michigan, it attracted national attention following the indictment of Donald Trump attorney, Michael Cohen, a Cooley alumnus. The criticisms are based on Cooley's admission standards (among the ten lowest in the country, accepting at some points over 85% of applicants), its low graduation rates, its low bar passage rates (which led to litigation between Cooley and the ABA over Cooley's accreditation), and its low job placement figures. Cooley counters that its admission policies are intended to provide access to a legal education to those traditionally denied such access.

According to the research conducted by Law School Transparency in 2017, Cooley was one of the most at-risk law schools for exploiting students for tuition.

Curriculum
Cooley awards J.D. and LL.M. degrees. Students may also obtain joint M.P.A. or M.B.A. degrees awarded by Western Michigan University. The J.D/M.B.A. is offered in partnership with Oakland University; the J.D./M.P.A. is offered in partnership with Western Michigan University until November 2023.

Cooley operates programs allowing ABA-approved foreign study credit in Canada, Australia, and New Zealand. In addition, students are able to study at ABA-approved programs in: Oxford, England; Santander, Spain; Toronto, Canada; Münster, Germany.

J.D. students are able to select from several specialized areas of legal study, known as "concentrations":

Clinical programs
Cooley offers clinical programs at each campus. Students who participate in any of the Michigan clinics are allowed to practice law in Michigan under the Michigan Court Rules by representing clients in court, drafting client documents, and giving legal advice under the supervision of faculty. The Innocence Project is nationally recognized in the United States for helping free persons wrongfully incarcerated by obtaining DNA evidence and providing pro bono legal advocacy to overturn their convictions—Cooley's Innocence Project clinic has contributed to overturning four convictions. Cooley also offers an elder law clinic, Sixty Plus, Inc., which provides free legal services to senior citizens, as well as two Public Defender's clinics, which allow students to work in the Public Defender's office with indigent clients who are accused of committing a crime. The Access to Justice Clinic provides a general civil practice, focusing on family and consumer law. Free legal help in family law and domestic violence matters is offered at the Family Legal Assistance Project. Evening and weekend students can gain experience in the Estate Planning Clinics or the Public Sector Law Project, which provides civil legal services of a transactional, advisory, legislative or systemic nature to governments. Cooley offers externships throughout the United States at over 2600 approved externship sites. Student externs work under the supervision of experienced attorneys, with the guidance of full-time faculty.

Costs
The total cost of attending Cooley (tuition, fees, and living expenses) for the 2022–2023 academic year is $66,706 to $69,506, depending on the campus.

Bar passage
Of the Cooley alumni who took the Michigan bar exam for the first time in July 2021, 48% passed, vs. a statewide average of 75%.

In May 2020, the council of the ABA's Section of Legal Education and Admissions to the Bar determined Cooley was among ten law schools that had failed to significantly comply with Standard 316, which was revised in 2019 to provide that at least 75% of an accredited law school's graduates who took a bar exam must pass one within two years of graduation. Cooley has been asked to submit a report by February 2021. If the report did not demonstrate compliance, Cooley would be asked to appear at the council's May 2021 meeting. Section 316 has been criticized for discouraging minority enrollment in law schools and the ABA has said that the Coronavirus pandemic will be taken into account when enforcing Section 316.

Cooley failed to reach the 75% standard as demonstrated by statistics released by the ABA at the end of April, 2021. Those statistics showed Cooley with a 62.31% pass rate for 2018 graduates, compared with 66.01% for 2017 graduates.

Post-graduation employment
In 2011, Cooley was one of 15 law schools sued in a series of unsuccessful class actions filed on behalf former students  alleging that they had been misled by deceptive statistics on employment and salary published by the schools. The case against Cooley was dismissed, as was a counter-suit by Cooley alleging libel, but the courts acknowledged that Cooley law grad's employment prospects were "dismal", that Cooley had the lowest admission standards of any law school in the country, with an acceptance rate 15% higher than the next-lowest law school, and that it had a high drop-out rate. The trial court observed in part that Cooley reporting a 76% employment rate was not objectively false, though it was based on survey returns rather than on all graduates, and that it did not distinguish between part- and full-time employment or legal vs non-legal jobs, and that "it would be unreasonable for Plaintiffs to rely on two-bare bones statistics in deciding to attend a bottom-tier law school with the lowest admission standard in the country".

According to disclosures now required by the ABA, 43.8% of graduates from the class of 2021 obtained full-time, long-term, bar-passage-required employment nine months after graduation, while 20.0% of graduates were unemployed 9 months after graduation.

Notable faculty
 Spencer Abraham: former United States Senator and United States Secretary of Energy
 Robert Holmes Bell: District Judge of the United States District Court for the Western District of Michigan
 Thomas E. Brennan: founder of Cooley Law School; former Chief Justice Michigan Supreme Court
 Justin Brooks: criminal defense attorney; lecturer on criminal law and death penalty law
 Stuart Dunnings III: former prosecutor for Ingham County, Michigan
 John Warner Fitzgerald: deceased former Chief Justice of the Michigan Supreme Court
 James Cooper Morton: lecturer on evidence and advanced evidence
 Philip J. Prygoski: constitutional law expert and author, American Law Institute member
 John W. Reed: University of Michigan graduate; Fellow of the International Society of Barristers
 James L. Ryan: judge on the United States Court of Appeals for the Sixth Circuit; member of the Sovereign Military Order of Malta; US Navy Reserve, Captain, Ret.

Notable alumni
 Rosemarie Aquilina: circuit court judge, Ingham County, Michigan
 Chris Chocola: former representative from Indiana's 2nd congressional district
 Michael Cohen: former lawyer for Donald Trump
 Jon Cooper: head coach of the Tampa Bay Lightning
 Kevin Cotter: Michigan representative for the 99th district; Speaker of the House 2015–16
 Todd Courser: former Michigan representative from the 82nd District
 Alan Cropsey: member of Michigan Senate and House of Representatives
 Diane Dietz: Big Ten Conference Chief Communication Officer
 Torren Ecker: representative for the 193rd District in the Pennsylvania House of Representatives
 John Engler: former Governor of Michigan; Chairman of Blackford Capital's Michigan Prosperity Fund
 Andrew Farmer: Tennessee representative for the 17th District
 Frank M. Fitzgerald: member of Michigan House of Representatives, 1987–98.
 A.T. Frank: judge of Michigan's 70th District Court; former member of Michigan House of Representatives; former Chairman of the Michigan State Tax Commission.
 Edward Gaffney: Michigan state representative; director of the Michigan Center for Truck Safety
 Anthony H. Gair: New York City attorney
 Mark Grisanti: Buffalo, New York state senator, 60th district; as of 2015, acting New York Supreme Court Judge
 Paul Hillegonds: former Michigan representative for the 88th district; director of government relations for DTE Energy
 Jim Howell: Michigan representative who represented a portion of Saginaw County
 Iqra Khalid: Canadian Member of Parliament since 2015
 Joseph Lagana: member, New Jersey General Assembly
 Charles Macheers: Kansas representative for the 39th district
 Hiroe Makiyama: House of Councillors of the National Diet of Japan
 Jane Markey: judge, Michigan Court of Appeals, Third District
 Edward Mermelstein: New York City attorney and real estate developer; guest commentator on CNBC, Reuters, and Fox Business news channels
 Tedd Nesbit: representative for the Pennsylvania House of Representatives, District 8
 Joseph P. Overton: political scientist  senior vice president of the Mackinac Center for Public Policy
 Mark Plawecki: Michigan 20th District Judge
 Ruby Sahota: Canadian Member of Parliament
 Nicholas Scutari: New Jersey State Senate
 Steve Stern: New York assemblyman
 Bart Stupak: former representative from Michigan's 1st congressional district
 Rashida Tlaib: U.S. representative for Michigan's 13th congressional district; former Michigan state representative

References

External links
 

Independent law schools in the United States
Law schools in Michigan
Education in Lansing, Michigan
Educational institutions established in 1972
1972 establishments in Michigan
Universities and colleges in Ingham County, Michigan